Rafael Rodrigues de Araújo (born June 13, 1991) is a Brazilian volleyball player, a member of the Brazil men's national volleyball team and Polish club ONICO Warszawa.

Sporting achievements

Clubs 
 2009/2010  Brazilian Superliga, with Cimed/Florianópolis
 2014/2015  Brazilian Superliga, with SESI São Paulo

South American Club Championship
  2010 – with Cimed/Florianópolis

National team 
  2013 FIVB U23 World Championship
  2014 FIVB World League
  2015 Pan American Games

References

External links
PlusLiga player profile
OnicoWarszawa profile
Volleyball-Movies profile

1991 births
Living people
People from Umuarama
Brazilian men's volleyball players
Expatriate volleyball players in Poland
Brazilian expatriates in Poland
Projekt Warsaw players
Pan American Games medalists in volleyball
Pan American Games silver medalists for Brazil
Volleyball players at the 2015 Pan American Games
Medalists at the 2015 Pan American Games
Sportspeople from Paraná (state)